The Statute of Distribution (22 & 23 Car 2 c 10) was an Act of the Parliament of England in 1670. It deals with the administration of intestate estates. It was made perpetual by the Administration of Intestates' Estate Act 1685 (1 Ja. 2 c. 17).

The whole Act, so far as it applied to deaths occurring after the commencement of the Administration of Estates Act 1925 (1 January 1926), was repealed by section 56 of, and Part I of Schedule 2 to, the Administration of Estates Act 1925.

For the construction of references to Statutes of Distribution, see section 50 of the Administration of Estates Act 1925 and section 19 of the Administration of Estates Act (Northern Ireland) 1955.

References
Halsbury's Statutes,

Acts of the Parliament of England
1670 in law
1670 in England